Mario is the Italian, French, Croatian, Spanish, Portuguese, Romanian, Bulgarian, Greek, and Nigerian English form of the Latin Roman name Marius.

In Croatia, the name Mario was among the most common masculine given names in the decades between 1970 and 1999, and was the most common name in the 1970s.

The Portuguese version of the name is spelled Mário (to indicate that the "a" is stressed).

It is also associated with the highly popular and beloved Nintendo franchise Super Mario and its eponymous character Mario.

Notable people and characters named Mario include:

Given name

Artists and musicians
Mario (American singer) (born 1986), Mario Dewar Barrett, an American R&B singer
Mario Adorf (born 1930), German actor
Mario Amaya (1933–1986), American art critic
Mario Biondi (born 1971), Italian singer
Mario Cantone (born 1959), American comedian and actor
Mario Chicot, also simply Mario, zouk singer from Guadeloupe
Mario Domm (born 1977), Mexican singer and member of Camila
Mario Duplantier, French Drummer
Mario Frangoulis (born 1967), Greek tenor
Mario Lanza (1921–1959), Italian American opera tenor singer and actor
Mario del Monaco (1915–1982), Italian tenor
Mario Maurer (born 1988), Thai actor and model
Mario Milita (1923–2017), Italian voice actor
Mario Moro (1918–2002), Italian singer
Mario Nascimbene (1913–2002), Italian film score composer
Mario Sammarco (1868–1930), Italian operatic baritone
Mario Sciacca, Italian-Danish singer, part of the Danish pop duo Muri & Mario
Mario Tozzi (1895–1979), Italian painter
Mario Vazquez (born 1977), American Idol contestant and singer
Mario Van Peebles (born 1957), American director and actor
Mario Winans (born 1974), R&B singer

Politicians
Mario Aoun (born 1951), Lebanese politician
Mario Baccini (born 1957), Italian politician 
Mario Chella (1934–2022), Italian politician
Mario Cuomo (1932–2015), governor of New York
Mario Draghi (born 1947), Prime Minister of Italy and former president of the ECB
Mario Dumont (born 1970), Canadian politician
Mario Gentile, municipal politician in Toronto
Mario Landolfi (born 1959), Italian politician
Mario Martinelli (1906 –2001), Italian politician 
Mario Monti (born 1943), Italian economist and former Prime Minister of Italy
Mario Pedini (1918–2003), Italian politician 
Mario Roberto Santucho (1936–1976), Argentine revolutionary and guerrilla combatant
Mario Savio (1942–1996), American political activist
Mário Soares (1924–2017), Portuguese politician and the former Prime Minister of Portugal
Mario Tanassi (1916–2007), Italian politician
Mario Umana (1914–2005), American judge and politician
Mario Zagari (1913–1996), Italian politician

Sportsmen
Mario Aerts (born 1974), Belgian cyclist
Mario Ančić (born 1984), Croatian professional tennis player 
Mario Andretti (born 1940), American race car driver
Mario Arteaga (born 1970), Mexican footballer
Mario Avellaneda (born 1974), Spanish race walker
Mario Balotelli (born 1990), Italian footballer
Mario Been (born 1963), Dutch footballer and manager
Mario Chalmers (born 1986), American basketball player
Mario Cipollini (born 1967), Italian road cyclist
Mario Corso (1941–2020), Italian footballer
Mario Delaš (born 1990), Croatian basketball player
Mario Domínguez (born 1975), Mexican race car driver
Mario Elie (born 1963), American basketball player
Mario Figueroa (born 1963), Venezuelan road cyclist
Mario Gaspar (born 1990), Spanish footballer
Mario Gómez (born 1985), German footballer
Mario González (Mexican boxer) (born 1969), Mexican boxer
Mario González (swimmer) (born 1975), Cuban swimmer
Mario Goodrich (born 2000), American football player
Mario Götze (born 1992), German footballer
Mario Henderson (1984–2020), American football player
Mario Hezonja (born 1995), Croatian basketball player
Mario Hollands (born 1988), American baseball player
Marios Kaperonis (born 1983), Greek boxer
Mario Kempes (born 1954), Argentine retired footballer
Mario Kummer (born 1962), German track and road cyclist and manager
Mario Lemieux (born 1965), Canadian ice hockey player
Mario Lemina (born 1993), Gabonese footballer 
Mario Mancini (born 1966), American professional wrestler 
Mario Mandžukić (born 1986), Croatian footballer
Mario Manningham (born 1986), American football player
Mario Maraschi (1939–2020), Italian footballer and manager
Mario Melchiot (born 1976), Dutch footballer
Mario Mendoza (born 1950), Mexican baseball player
Mario Mijatović (born 1980), Croatian footballer
Mário Rui (born 1925), Portuguese footballer
Mário Rui (born 1991), Portuguese footballer
Mário Sabino (born 1972), Brazilian judoka
Mario Salas (footballer) (born 1967), Chilean footballer
Mario Santos de Matos (born 1988), Belgian footballer
Mario Sperry (born 1966), Brazilian heavyweight martial artist
Mario Stanić (born 1972), Croatian footballer
Mario Tremblay (born 1956), Canadian professional ice hockey player and coach
Mario Valles (born 1982), Colombian judoka
Mario Villagran (born 1986), Mexican professional wrestler
Mario Williams (born 1985), American football player
Mário Zagallo (born 1931), Brazilian footballer and coach

Others
Mario Barth (born 1972), German comedian 
Mario Batali (born 1960), American chef
Mario Benedetti (1920–2009), Uruguayan journalist, novelist, and poet
Mario Berlinguer (1891–1969), Italian lawyer
Mario Bezzi (1868–1927), Italian entomologist
Mario Botta (born 1943), Italian architect
Mario Caldato, Jr. (born 1961), Brazilian-American record producer and engineer
Mario Capecchi (born 1937), Italian-American scientist
Mario Caserini (1874–1920), Italian film director
Mario Ceroli (born 1938), Italian sculptor
Mario Condello (1952–2006), Australian gangster
Mario Conti (1934-2022), Scottish Roman Catholic prelate
Mario Costa (disambiguation), several people
Mario Impemba (born 1963), American sports announcer
Mario Joyner (born 1961), American stand-up comedian
Mario Armando Lavandeira Jr., better-known as Perez Hilton, American celebrity gossip blogger
Mario Lopez (born 1973), American actor and television host
Mario Lopez Estrada, Guatemalan businessman
Mario Magnotta (1942–2009), Italian janitor, Internet phenomenon
Mario Monicelli (1915–2010), Italian director and screenwriter
Mario Monticelli (1902–1995), Italian chess player
Mario Napolitano (1910–1995), Italian chess player
Mario Nuzzolese (1915–2008), Italian journalist
Mario Pérez Saldivar (born 1939), Mexican long-distance runner
Mario Pérez Zúñiga (born 1982), Mexican footballer
Mario Pezzi (1898–1968), Italian aviator
Mario Più, Italian DJ
Mario Puzo (1920–1999), American author known chiefly for his novel The Godfather
Mario Salcedo (born 1949 or 1950), a long-term passenger on Royal Caribbean International-branded cruise ships
Mario Salieri, Italian porn director
Mario Scaramella (born 1970), Italian lawyer
Mario Segale (1934–2018), American real-estate agent of whom the Mario character is named after
Mario Soldati (1906–1999), Italian film director
Mario Sorrenti (born 1971), Italian American photographer
Mario Testino (born 1954), Italian Peruvian photographer
Marios Tokas (1954–2008), Cypriot songwriter
 Mario Vaquerizo (born 1974), Spanish collaborator of radio and television

Surname
E. A. Mario, Italian composer
Giovanni Matteo Mario (Giovanni Matteo de Candia 1810–1883), operatic tenor singer of the 19th century
Lorenza Mario, Italian dancer

Fictional characters 
Mario, Nintendo video game character

See also
 Mareo (given name), Japanese
 Marijo, Croatian
 Mariusz, Polish
 Μάριος, Greek

References

Italian masculine given names
French masculine given names
Croatian masculine given names
Portuguese masculine given names
Spanish masculine given names
Bulgarian masculine given names
Greek masculine given names
English masculine given names
Romanian masculine given names
Masculine given names